Parupeneus multifasciatus, the manybar goatfish, is a species of goatfish native to the eastern Indian Ocean Pacific Ocean where it is found from Christmas Island to the Hawaiian Islands and from southern Japan to Lord Howe Island.  

Description 
A recognizable feature of the goatfish is their chin whiskers.  Some common features are yellow or blue accents on the edges of scales, dark spots around the eyes, dark spots around the base of the pectoral fin, and white and dark bars.  Some common color variations include: red with black spots; light red with no spots; black with yellow spot near the tail; and purple-red with yellow and black spots.  Males of this species can reach a length of  TL while females only reach  SL.  Their reproductive size is 7 inch (17.8 cm).  The heaviest recorded moano was 453 g (0.9987 lb).   The life history of the moano has a pelagic larval duration of 24 – 28 days in captivity.

Ecology 
Moano are common reef fish found in shallow water environments, reef flats, and outside reefs.  They spend a lot of their time in the benthic zone.  They can be found at depths 0 – 161 m deep (0 – 528 ft).  

They are endemic in three regions: Hawaiʻi, Marquesas, and the Indo-Polynesian Province.

Diet 
They are diurnal consumers that prey on crustaceans and small fishes.  They can be omnivores.

Fishing regulations 
In Hawaiʻi, it is common to catch moano using nets / traps, spears, and pole/line.  In Hawaiʻi, the minimum size requirement is seven inches, and eight inches on the island of Maui.

Human Uses 
Moano are game fish that can be eaten raw, broiled, or baked.  This is a commercially important species, and can be found in the aquarium trade.

References

External links
 

multifasciatus
Fish of Hawaii
Fish described in 1825